The following people were all minor authors of Greek Middle Comedy. None of their works have survived intact, but later writers of Late Antiquity provide the titles of some of their plays as well as brief quotations.

D

Diocles
The following six titles, along with associated fragments, are all that survives of Diocles' work. The Suda states that some accounts claimed that Diocles invented a means of playing music by striking saucers and pottery vessels with a wooden stick.

The Bacchae
Bees
The Cyclopes
Dreams
Thalatta (name of a courtesan)
Thyestes

O

Ophelion
Kassel-Austin places Ophelion in the Middle Comedy period. The Suda credits him with six plays: Callaeschrus, Centaur, Deucalion, Muses, Recluses, and Satyrs. Athenaeus cites his work four times.

S

Sophilus
The Suda claims that Sophilus was from either Sicyon or Thebes. The following nine titles, along with associated fragments, are all that survives of Sophilus' work.

Androcles
The Citharode
The Deposit
The Handbook
Marriage
The Phylarch
Those Running Together
The Woman From Delos
Tyndareos or  Leda

Sotades of Athens
The Suda confuses this playwright with the iambic poet Sotades of Maroneia. Of his work, only the following three titles (along with associated fragments) have come down to us: Charinus, The Ransomed Man, and The Shut-In Women.

T

Theophilus
The following nine titles, along with associated fragments, are all that survives of Theophilus' work.

The Citharode
The Daughters of Proetus
The Flute-Lover
The Men From Epidaurus
Neoptolemus
The Pancratiast
The Physician
Those Traveling Abroad
Women From Boeotia

Timotheus of Athens
The Suda lists four plays by Timotheus of Athens: The Boxer, The Changing Man (or The Shifting Man), The Deposit, and The Puppy. Only one four-line quotation of Timotheus' work survives, a quotation from The Puppy by Athenaeus.

X

Xenarchus
The following eight titles, along with associated fragments, are all that survives of Xenarchus' work.

Boutalion
The Pentathlete
Porphyra (possibly written by Timocles)
Priapus
The Scythians
Sleep
The Soldier
The Twins

References

Ancient Greek dramatists and playwrights
Ancient Greek poets
Middle Comic poets